Stephen Francis Mackreth (born 1 July 1950) is a Welsh former professional footballer who played as a full-back. He made appearances in the English Football League with Wrexham.

References

1950 births
Living people
Welsh footballers
Association football defenders
Wrexham A.F.C. players
Oswestry Town F.C. players
English Football League players
Sportspeople from Wrexham County Borough